Classic Limited Edition is the only studio album by American hip hop group Made Men. It was released on August 24, 1999 through Restless Records and ZNO Records. Production was handled mostly by the group's production team Hangmen 3, alongside Deric "D-Dot" Angelettie, Kanye West, L.E.S., Dame Grease, Daz Dillinger, Trackmasters and Vincent Herbert. It features guest appearances from Wiseguys, Big Pun, Big Tray Deee, Cardan, Mase, Master P, Monifah, Montell Jordan, Queen Pen, Tha Dogg Pound and The Lox. The album peaked at #61 on the Billboard 200 and #9 on the Billboard Top R&B/Hip-Hop Albums chart in the United States.

Track listing

Charts

References

External links

Made Men albums
1999 debut albums
Albums produced by Kanye West
Albums produced by Dame Grease
Albums produced by Trackmasters
Albums produced by Daz Dillinger
Albums produced by L.E.S. (record producer)